Joseph-Alphonse Esménard (1770, in Pélissanne – 25 June 1811, in Fondi) was a French poet and the brother of the journalist Jean-Baptiste Esménard and father of the artists Inès Esménard and Nathalie Elma d'Esménard.

Biography
In 1790, a year after the beginning of the French Revolution, Esménard was a royalist deputy. He was proscribed on Aug. 10, 1792 and consequently left France to travel around Europe, going to England, the Netherlands, Germany, Italy, Constantinople (present-day Istanbul in Turkey), and Greece.  Returning to Paris in 1797, he wrote for La Quotidienne but was forced to emigrate again that same year after the Coup of 18 Fructidor in September, not without first spending two months in the Prison du Temple.

He returned to France again after the Coup of 18 Brumaire in 1799, but afterwards left for Saint-Domingue as secretary to general Leclerc on the Saint-Domingue expedition to put down the uprising of Toussaint Louverture. On his return from this expedition, he was put in charge of the censorship in the imperial theatres, a posting he gained thanks to being a protege of the minister of police, Anne Jean Marie René Savary. Soon after this, he left once again to follow admiral Villaret de Joyeuse to Martinique, where he served as a writer for The Mercury.

Esménard then came back to France for good, where he received favors from the imperial government for services rendered, including as censor of theatres and libraries and censor of the Journal de l'Empire. In 1810, he was elected to the Académie française.

For having published a satirical article against one of Napoleon's envoys to Russia in the Journal de l'Empire, he was exiled to Italy for a few months. On his return trip he died in a carriage accident at Fondi, near Naples.

Works
Esménard is best known for the didactic and descriptive poem entitled La Navigation, first published in eight verses in 1805, then re-edited to six verses in 1806. It is a precise work, drawn from observations made by the author in the course of his travels. Its versification, however, is monotonous and it is marked by a total absence of action and movement.

Esménard also wrote Le triomphe de Trajan (The Triumph of Trajan), a three-act opera with music by Jean-François Lesueur, on the life of Trajan but full of flattering allusions to Napoleon I of France. It was produced to triumphal reviews in 1807. He also wrote the three-act opera Fernand Cortez ou la conquête du Mexique (Fernand Cortez or the Conquest of Mexico, 1809) in collaboration with Victor-Joseph-Étienne de Jouy, with music by Gaspare Spontini. This too proved very successful. He also wrote several verses to the glory of Napoleon, collected as La Couronne poétique de Napoléon (1807).

References

External links
  

French poets
French opera librettists
19th-century French writers
People of the First French Empire
Censors
1770 births
1811 deaths
French male poets
French male dramatists and playwrights
19th-century male writers